The striped kukri snake (Oligodon octolineatus) is a species of snake of the family Colubridae. 

The species is gonochoric and reproduces sexually with oviparity. 

The species can be found in countries like Malaysia, Singapore, Brunei, and Indonesia.

References 

Reptiles described in 1801
Reptiles of the Malay Peninsula
Colubrids
Oligodon
Reptiles of Borneo
Reptiles of Singapore
Reptiles of Sulawesi